The 1992 IAAF World Road Relay Championships was the first edition of the global, international marathon relay competition, organised by the International Association of Athletics Federations (IAAF). It marked the formal establishment of an ekiden as a world championship event, following on from the non-championship 1986 IAAF World Challenge Road Relay. The event took place on 9–10 May in Funchal, Portugal with the participation of 138 athletes (90 men and 48 women) from 16 nations. The women's race took place on Saturday 9 May and the men's race took place on Sunday 10 April.

Each national team consisted of six athletes, who alternately covered six stages to complete the 42.195 km marathon distance. The first, third and fifth stages were of 5 km, the second and fourth stages were of 10 km, and the final stage covered the remaining 7.195 km.

In the women's race, Lisa York put the British ahead by twelve seconds in the first leg, but Marian Sutton was unable to finish the second leg, forcing Britain out of the rankings. Denmark's Dorthe Rasmussen made up a minute over the field in the second leg, bringing her nation into contention alongside Portugal. Stage wins by Felicidade Sena and Conceição Ferreira created a significant lead for Portugal and Fernanda Ribeiro won the last stage to bring her country home in 2:20:14 hours. Denmark were next to finish, almost four and a half minutes later, following by Spain with 2:25:06. The Romanian team were fast finishers in fourth shortly after, having been unable to make up for a disastrous two-minute deficit from the first leg.

In the men's race, the Kenyan team enjoyed a clear victory, starting with the two fastest initial legs through Eliud Barngetuny and William Koech. Britain's John Mayock gained nine seconds on the Kenyans in the third leg, but subsequent stage wins by William Sigei, Richard Tum and William Mutwol secured victory for Kenya with over a minute and a half to spare. Portugal pulled well clear of the British in the second leg of Dionísio Castro and eventually took second place with a minute's advantage over Britain.

Medal summary

Stage winners

Results

Men's race

Women's race

References

1992
World Road Relay Championships
World Road Relay Championships
World Road Relay Championships
May 1992 sports events in Europe
Sport in Madeira
Funchal
International athletics competitions hosted by Portugal
Marathons in Portugal